The Atlanta Thoroughbreds were an indoor football team.  They were a 2007 expansion member of the National Indoor Football League (NIFL).  They were scheduled to play their home games at the John H. Lewis Gymnasium in Atlanta, Georgia, but failed to play any home games.  Of the 2007 league-owned expansion teams, the Thoroughbreds were the only team that was competitive, losing both games (before the league collapsed) by 14 points or less.  After the league collapsed, the team became a primarily fill-in team and many players left. The head coach was John Mannino. The offense was led by QB, J.R. Revere and defense by S, Brad Shea.

Season-By-Season 

|-
|2007 || 0 || 4 || 0 || 5th Atlantic || --

External links
Official Website

National Indoor Football League teams
Sports teams in Atlanta